Jiří Bachroň (born 9 January 1960) is a Czech sports shooter. He competed in the mixed 50 metre running target event at the 1980 Summer Olympics.

References

1960 births
Living people
Czech male sport shooters
Olympic shooters of Czechoslovakia
Shooters at the 1980 Summer Olympics
Place of birth missing (living people)